Tadeusz Truskolaski (born 10 April 1958, in Stare Kapice, Białystok County, Poland) is an economist and politician. A member of the Civic Platform (Platforma Obywatelska) party, he has been the president (mayor) of the Polish city of Białystok since 5 December 2006, succeeding Ryszard Tur of the Christian National Union.

Since 2011 he is a member of the European Alliance Group at the European Committee of the Regions.

Academic career
Descended from the Polish nobility officially extinguished in 1921, his is one of 530 family names which traditionally bear the Ślepowron coat of arms. After graduation he began work as a university teacher. In 1996 he earned a doctorate in economic sciences at the Białystok branch of the University of Warsaw. His Ph.D. thesis was Transport planning as a factor in the development of cities in Northeastern Poland. On 3 April 2007 he was habilitated at the University of Białystok after defending a second dissertation entitled Transport and dynamics of economic growth in the Southeastern Baltic. He is an author of about 70 papers on economics.

Politics
He was employed by Rządowe Centrum Studiów Strategicznych (Government Centre for Strategic Studies) where he worked on the regional planning of Poland. He directed the Department of Regional Politics in Urzad Marszalkowski (Marshal's Office) of Podlaskie Voivodeship, where he obtained 52 million euros from the European Union's PHARE program to help ease Poland's accession to the EU. He is an advisor to the Minister of Regional Development.

In 2006 he ran for mayor of the city of Bialystok as a candidate of the Civic Platform party. In the first round of the elections he received 49% of the votes (42,889 votes altogether). In the later runoff he defeated his rival Marek Kozlowski from the Law and Justice (Prawo i Sprawiedliwość) party, receiving 67% of the votes cast (53,018 votes). He was sworn in as mayor on 5 December 2006.

Esperanto activities
In August 2007 Truskolaski delivered a speech at the 92nd World Congress of Esperanto in Yokohama. In his speech he urged attendees to commemorate the 150th anniversary of the birth of the originator of Esperanto by attending the 2009 World Congress in Ludwik Zemenhof's home town of Białystok. The mayor cited Białystok as "a place which is the melting pot of different nations, religions, cultures, customs and traditions" and "an example of the integration of ethnic and religious groups, a meeting place for Poles, Belarusians, Jews, Lithuanians, Germans, Russians and Tartars." This multi-ethnicity, he said, was one reason for Zamenhof to develop the universal language of Esperanto.

That 94th World Congress of Esperanto duly began the last weekend of July at the University of Białystok, with about 2,000 participants, including French architect Louis-Christophe Zaleski-Zamenhof, a grandson of Esperanto's founder and a strong proponent of the Esperanto movement. The attendees were again greeted in the Esperanto language by Mayor Truskolaski and the Deputy Mayor Alexander Sosna, who had served as chair of the World Congress organizing committee.

Aside from Polish, Truskolaski  also speaks both English and Russian. He has a wife Ewa, a daughter Emilia and a son Krzysztof.

Selected publications
 Podstawy finansów przedsiębiorstw ("Basics of finance") Białystok Univ. Press, 2002. 
 Transport a dynamika wzrostu gospodarczego w południowo-wschodnich krajach bałtyckich ("Transport and dynamics of economic growth in the southeastern Baltic") Białystok Univ. Press, 2006.

Notes

1958 births
Living people
People from Tykocin
Civic Platform politicians
Mayors of Białystok
Academic staff of the University of Białystok
Polish economists